The frank was the currency of Vlorë, issued in 1924. It was subdivided into 100 . It was only issued in paper money form, with denominations of 10 and 25 , 1 and 2 frank. It was replaced by the Albanian franc in 1926.

References

Currencies of Europe
Modern obsolete currencies 
1924 establishments in Albania
1926 disestablishments
1920s economic history
Modern history of Albania